Paul Bevan (born 27 September 1984) is an Australian rules football player with the Sydney Swans of the Australian Football League (AFL).

Having grown up in Sydney, playing for Western Suburbs Magpies AFC in the Sydney AFL and the NSW/ACT under-18s team, he was elevated from the Swans' rookie list in 2004.

He played 24 senior games in that year and earned a nomination for the Rising Star award in round four. In 2005, he played 15 games and was a member of the Swans' first premiership winning team in 72 years.

In 2010, Bevan managed to solidify his place in the senior side again. He played mostly in defence but also appeared in the forward line, where he had trained all off season, to good effect. His best game of the year was possibly the Elimination Final against Carlton, in which he kicked 3 goals as a dangerous small forward. He was dropped along with Jesse White the next week however as Ben McGlynn and Daniel Bradshaw were brought back from injury. He requested a trade to a Victorian club due to his omission from the finals side, but no trade was arranged and he stayed a Swan in 2011. Bevan was delisted by the Swans after he struggled to find form and consistency in the last few years.

Bevan has played for the Perth Demons in the WAFL (Western Australia) for the past two years.

Statistics

|- style="background-color: #EAEAEA"
! scope="row" style="text-align:center" | 2004
|style="text-align:center"|
| 42 || 24 || 7 || 2 || 132 || 102 || 234 || 75 || 46 || 0.3 || 0.1 || 5.5 || 4.3 || 9.8 || 3.1 || 1.9
|-
! scope="row" style="text-align:center" | 2005
|style="text-align:center;"|
| 42 || 15 || 3 || 1 || 68 || 51 || 119 || 34 || 36 || 0.2 || 0.1 || 4.5 || 3.4 || 7.9 || 2.3 || 2.4
|- style="background:#eaeaea;"
! scope="row" style="text-align:center" | 2006
|style="text-align:center;"|
| 42 || 9 || 0 || 1 || 70 || 36 || 106 || 45 || 36 || 0.0 || 0.1 || 7.8 || 4.0 || 11.8 || 5.0 || 4.0
|-
! scope="row" style="text-align:center" | 2007
|style="text-align:center;"|
| 42 || 17 || 3 || 1 || 109 || 94 || 203 || 83 || 35 || 0.2 || 0.1 || 6.4 || 5.5 || 11.9 || 4.9 || 2.1
|- style="background:#eaeaea;"
! scope="row" style="text-align:center" | 2008
|style="text-align:center;"|
| 42 || 24 || 10 || 10 || 182 || 133 || 315 || 124 || 86 || 0.4 || 0.4 || 7.6 || 5.5 || 13.1 || 5.2 || 3.6
|-
! scope="row" style="text-align:center" | 2009
|style="text-align:center;"|
| 42 || 19 || 2 || 3 || 132 || 137 || 269 || 99 || 53 || 0.1 || 0.2 || 6.9 || 7.2 || 14.2 || 5.2 || 2.8
|- style="background:#eaeaea;"
! scope="row" style="text-align:center" | 2010
|style="text-align:center;"|
| 42 || 14 || 9 || 9 || 120 || 87 || 207 || 78 || 35 || 0.6 || 0.6 || 8.6 || 6.2 || 14.8 || 5.6 || 2.5
|-
! scope="row" style="text-align:center" | 2011
|style="text-align:center;"|
| 42 || 7 || 5 || 7 || 38 || 25 || 63 || 14 || 37 || 0.7 || 1.0 || 5.4 || 3.6 || 9.0 || 2.0 || 5.3
|- class="sortbottom"
! colspan=3| Career
! 129
! 39
! 34
! 851
! 665
! 1516
! 552
! 364
! 0.3
! 0.3
! 6.6
! 5.2
! 11.8
! 4.3
! 2.8
|}

Family
He is the great nephew of rugby league legend Brian Bevan.

References

External links

 Sydney Swans site player profile

1984 births
Living people
Australian rules footballers from Sydney
Sydney Swans players
Sydney Swans Premiership players
NSW/ACT Rams players
Perth Football Club players
Western Suburbs Magpies AFC players
One-time VFL/AFL Premiership players